Jorge Hirano Matsumoto (born 16 August 1956 in Huaral) is a former Japanese Peruvian football player.

Club career
Hirano didn't have the looks of a prolific goal scorer nonetheless of a forward but he compensated his slight figure with extraordinary speed.

If he was cheered with La Celeste of Sporting Cristal, he was idolized across of the Cordillera with another Celeste: the one of Club Bolivar of La Paz, where he played eight years and scored 139 goals.

International career
Hirano played a total of 36 games for Peru between 1984 and 1991, scoring 11 goals.

Honors

References

External links
Profile at Asociacion Peruano Japonesa

1956 births
Living people
People from Lima Region
Peruvian people of Japanese descent
Peruvian footballers
Peruvian expatriate footballers
Peru international footballers
1987 Copa América players
1989 Copa América players
1991 Copa América players
Bolivian Primera División players
Japan Soccer League players
Expatriate footballers in Japan
Expatriate footballers in Bolivia
Peruvian expatriate sportspeople in Bolivia
Peruvian Primera División players
Unión Huaral footballers
Shonan Bellmare players
Sporting Cristal footballers
Club Bolívar players
Deportivo Sipesa footballers
Sport Boys footballers
Association football forwards